DXGG (107.1 FM), broadcasting as Happy FM 107.1, is a radio station owned and operated by Iddes Broadcast Group. Its studios and transmitter are located at the 2nd Floor, Montana Bldg., Moreno St. cor. San Isidro St., Brgy. 1, Malaybalay.

References

Radio stations established in 2012
Radio stations in Bukidnon